Final tables of the Lithuanian Championship in 2007 are presented below. The Lithuanian Football Federation (LFF) organized three football leagues: A Lyga (the highest), 1 Lyga (second-tier), and 2 Lyga (third-tier), which comprised several zones. For the first time a separate league for farm teams was set up.

A Lyga

Farm team league

1 Lyga

2 Lyga

2 Lyga zone South

2 Lyga zone North

References
 

LFF Lyga seasons
1
Lith
Lith